Felle is a surname. Notable people with the surname include:

Amelia Felle (born 1961), Italian opera singer and voice teacher
Ernst Felle (1876–1959), German rower

See also
Feller (surname)
Fells (surname)
Pelle (surname)